The following list is a discography of productions by Harry Fraud, an American record producer and recording artist from New York City, New York. It includes a list of songs produced, co-produced and remixed by year, artist, album and title.

2009

French Montana - The Laundry Man 

 12. "Why So Serious"

French Montana - Mac Wit Da Cheese 

 04. "New York Minute" (featuring Jadakiss)

2010

French Montana - Mac & Cheese 2 

 04. "Day Dreaming (Go Hard)"
 06. "Money Money Money" (featuring Cheeze)
 08. "So High" (featuring Currensy)
 11. "New York Minute (Remix)" (featuring Chinx Drugz, Nicki Minaj, Ma$e and Jadakiss)

French Montana - Coke Boys 

 04. "Dope Man"
 05. "Lie To Me" (featuring Chinx Drugz and Flip)
 11. "Crack da Top" (featuring Cheeze)
 13. "Belong to Me" (featuring Cheeze)
 14. "We Run NY" (featuring Fat Joe)
 15. "Goin' In For The Kill" (featuring Chinx Drugz and Cheeze)
 16. "Hammer Long" (featuring Chinx Drugz, Cheeze and Brock)

2011

French Montana - Mister 16: Casino Life 

 01. "Intro"
 04. "Ready"
 11. "Coke Boyz (Middle Fingers Up)" (featuring Chinx Drugz, Flip and Charlie YG)
 13. "I Think I Luv Her"
 16. "Soul Food"
 18. "Shot Caller"
 20. "Movie"

French Montana - Coke Boys 2 

 01. "Ya Mean" (featuring Uncle Murda)
 03. "Its Just Me" (featuring Cheeze, Chinx Drugz and Flip)
 07. "Stylin On You" (featuring Chinx Drugz and Flip)
 08. "Red Light" (featuring Chinx Drugz and Cheeze)
 09. "Cocaine Mafia" (featuring Trae tha Truth)
 11. "Roll With Me" (featuring Chinx Drugz)
 13. "The Rush" (featuring S.A.S.)
 18. "Tell Me When" (featuring Cheeze and Charlie Rock)

Juicy J - Blue Dream & Lean 

 22. "Stoner's Night 2" (featuring Wiz Khalifa)

French Montana, Juicy J, and Project Pat - Cocaine Mafia 

 04. "Do It"
 16. "Full Of Everything" (featuring Chinx Drugz)

2012

Wiz Khalifa - Taylor Allderdice 

 17. "Blindfolds" (featuring Juicy J)

Fat Trel - Nightmare on E St. 

 05. "Deep in the Game" (featuring Rick Ross)

French Montana - Coke Boys 3 

 17. "Cool Whip" (performed by Charlie Rock and Cheeze)
 18. "Tap That" (performed by French Montana and Chinx Drugz featuring Stack Bundles)

Chevy Woods - Gang Land 

 20. "Delonte West"

Maybach Music Group - Self Made Vol. 2 

 08. "The Zenith"

Meyhem Lauren - Respect the Fly Shit 

 01. "Fingerless Driving Gloves" (produced with Tommy Mas)
 02. "Drug Lords" (featuring AG da Coroner and Action Bronson)
 05. "Special Effects" (featuring Heems and Action Bronson)
 06. "BBQ Brisket" (featuring Action Bronson and AG da Coroner)
 07. "Grown Man Palettes" (featuring Sean Price)
 09. "Juevos Rancheros" (feat. AG da Coroner, Heems and Riff Raff)
 10. "Radioactive Tuna" (featuring Smoke DZA, J-Love and Thirstin Howl III)

Smoke DZA - K.O.N.Y. 

 04. "Butta Rice"

Currensy - Priest Andretti 

 09. "Payroll" (featuring Young Roddy)

Shabaam Sahdeeq - Degrees of Separation 

 09. "Futuristic" (featuring Eddie B)

Mr. Muthafuckin' eXquire - Power & Passion 

 02. "Cheap Whores & Champagne"

French Montana - Mac & Cheese 3 

 01. "Only If for a Night (Intro)"
 09. "State of Mind"
 13. "Triple Double" (featuring Mac Miller and Currensy)
 20. "Mean" (featuring Action Bronson)

2013

Casey Veggies - Life Changes 

 11. "I Love Me Some You"

Pusha T - Wrath of Caine 

 05. "Road Runner" (featuring Troy Ave)

Chinx Drugz - Cocaine Riot 3 

 13. "How Can I Lose"

Talib Kweli - Prisoner of Conscious 

 13. "Upper Echelon"

Currensy and Young Roddy - Bales 

 01. "Bales"
 05. "The War on Drugs"
 06. "100 Spokes"
 08. "AD4"

The Weeknd - Kiss Land 

 01. "Professional" (produced with DannyBoyStyles, The Weeknd, and DaHeala)

Flatbush Zombies - BetterOffDEAD 

 11. "LiveFromHell"

LoLa Monroe - Lipstick & Pistols 

 06. "Money on Dey Head" (featuring Juicy J)

Troy Ave - New York City: The Album 

 10. "Piggy Bank"

Chris Webby - Homegrown 

 05. "Left Lane"

2014

French Montana - Coke Boys 4 

 05. "88 Coupes" (featuring Jadakiss)
 08. "God Body" (featuring Chinx Drugz)

Awkword - World View 

 03. "Bars & Hooks" (featuring Sean Price, The Kid Daytona and The Incomparable Shakespeare)
 05. "The People's Champions" (featuring Shabaam Sahdeeq, Punchline and Beretta 9 of Killarmy)

Smoke DZA - Dream. Zone. Achieve 

 10. "I Don’t Know" (featuring Kobe)
 12. "Legends In The Making (Ashtray Pt. 2)" (featuring Wiz Khalifa and Currensy)

N.O.R.E. - Noreaster 

 07. "Cowboys and Indians"

Shabaam Sahdeeq - Keepers Of The Lost Art 

 08. "Tranquilo"

Styles P - Phantom and the Ghost 

 10. "For the Best"

Riff Raff - Neon Icon 

 06. "Lava Glaciers" (featuring Childish Gambino)

B-Real and Berner - Prohibition 

 07. "Smokers"

French Montana - Mac & Cheese: The Appetizer 

 01. "Haaan (Max B Speaks)"
 02. "Poison" (produced with Adrian Lau & The MeKanics)
 03. "How You Want It"
 04. "Dontchu"
 05. "Sweetest Thing"
 06. "Let You Know"
 07. "Playing In The Wind II"

Rich the Kid - Rich Than Famous 

 01. "Rich Than Famous" (Intro)"

2015

Currensy - Pilot Talk III 

 04. "Froze" (featuring Riff Raff)

Nacho Picasso - Blunt Raps 2 

 10. "In The Trump"
 13. "Virtue of Ignorance (Outro)"

Rich the Kid - Flexxin on Purpose 

 01. "Master P (Intro)"
 02. "Expensive"

Kool A.D. - O.K. 

 29. "Shotcaller Freestyle"
 40. "Jackson Pollock" (feat. Maffew Ragazino)

Wiki - Lil Me 

 12. "Sunday School Dropout" (featuring Hak)

2016

French Montana - Wave Gods 

 01. "Wave Gods (Intro)" (featuring Chris Brown) (produced with The Mekanics and AK47)

Rich the Kid - Trap Talk 

 12. "Outro"

Meyhem Lauren - Piatto D'oro 

 05. "Bonus Round" (featuring Action Bronson, Roc Marciano, and Big Body Bes)

Casey Veggies - Customized Greatly Vol. 4: The Return of The Boy 

 11. "Perfect Timing"

Taylor Gang - TGOD, Volume 1 

 17. "The Man"

French Montana - MC4 

 02. "Play Yaself"
 10. "Brick Road"
 14. "Chinx & Max / Paid For" (featuring Max B and Chinx) (Part 2 produced with The Alchemist and Masar)

Currensy - 12/30 

 11. "Above the Law" (featuring Smoke DZA)

2017

Playboi Carti - Playboi Carti 

 01. "Location"

French Montana - Jungle Rules 

 04. "A Lie" (featuring The Weeknd and Max B) (produced with DaHeala, DannyBoyStyles, and Masar)
 07. "Bring Dem Things" (featuring Pharrell) (produced with Pharrell)

ASAP Twelvyy - 12 

 08. "Yea Yea Yea (Maps)"

Sean Price - Imperius Rex 

 09. "The 3 Lyrical Ps" (featuring Prodigy and Styles P)

Dave East - Paranoia: A True Story 

 08. "Maneuver" (featuring French Montana)

Action Bronson - Blue Chips 7000 

 03. "The Chairman's Intent"
 05. "Bonzai"
 09. "Let Me Breathe"
 10. "9-24-7000" (featuring Rick Ross)

Smokepurpp - Deadstar 

 13. "Count Up" (featuring DRAM)

Nacho Picasso - AntiHero Vol. 2 

 02. "Queen of the Damned"
 03. "Temperature" (featuring ManManSavage) (produced with SAT)
 04. "Anything" (produced with Adrian Lau)
 05. "Night" (featuring Mistah F.A.B. and Kobe)
 07. "Panama Red" (featuring Smoke DZA)
 09. "Somehow" (featuring Raz Simone)

Hopsin - No Shame 

 08. "Black Sheep" (featuring Eric Tucker)

2018

Nacho Picasso - Role Model 

 01. "Role Model"
 03. "Ha Ha"
 05. "Want It All" (featuring Riff Raff"
 07. "The Saddest"

Rich the Kid - The World Is Yours 

 07. "Made It" (featuring Jay Critch and Rick Ross)

Westside Gunn - Supreme Blientele 

 12. "Spanish Jesus" (featuring Crimeapple)
 17. "AA Outro" (featuring AA Rashid)

Shy Glizzy - Fully Loaded 

 01. "Gimme a Hit"

Action Bronson - White Bronco 

 01. "Dr. Kimble"
 10. "Ring Ring" (featuring Big Body Bes)
 11. "Swerve on Em" (featuring ASAP Rocky)

Jay Critch - Hood Favorite 

 06. "Try It" (featuring French Montana and Fabolous)

Warhol.ss - Chest Pains 

 03. "Harry Cash"

2019

Wiz Khalifa and Currensy - 2009 

 14. "Forever Ball"

Wiz Khalifa - Fly Times Vol. 1: The Good Fly Young 

 08. "Yea Yup" (featuring Young Deji)

Rico Nasty - Anger Management 

 06. "Relative" (produced with Kenny Beats)

French Montana - Montana 

 01. "Montana" (produced with Prince 85 and French Montana)
 02. "Suicide Doors" (featuring Gunna)
 06. "Salam Alaykum" (produced with Mixx and French Montana)
 08. "Say Goodbye" (featuring Belly) (produced with Scorp Dezel, Mally Mall, and French Montana)
 09. "Coke Wave Boys" (featuring Chinx and Max B) (produced with Tony Seltzer)
 18. "Saucy"

2020

Jay Worthy - Two4one 

 07. "Uncle Brad" (featuring Elcamino)
 08. "Backpage Freestyle" (featuring Grafh and Daytona)

Wiz Khalifa - Big Pimpin''' ===

 09. "Top Down"
 10. "Good Time" (featuring Young Deji)
 12. "No Time"
 17. "Player Shit" (featuring Young Deji)

=== Action Bronson - Only for Dolphins ===

 02. "C12H16N2"
 11. "Marcus Aurelius"
 12. "Hard Target" (produced with Yung Mehico)

=== Jack Harlow - Thats What They All Say ===

 07. "Keep It Light"

== 2021 ==

=== Wifisfuneral - Smoking Mirrors ===

 06. "ScratchUrBack"

=== Rick Hyde - Plates II ===

 14. "Enrique" (featuring Meyhem Lauren)

=== French Montana - They Got Amnesia'' 

 12. "Tonight Only"

References 

Discographies of American artists
Production discographies
Hip hop discographies